Edward David Hospodar (born February 9, 1959) is an American former professional ice hockey defenseman who played nine seasons in the National Hockey League (NHL) for the New York Rangers, Hartford Whalers, Philadelphia Flyers, Minnesota North Stars and Buffalo Sabres. Hospodar did not see a great deal of ice time at any point in his career, and was used primarily as an enforcer.

He was best known for being one of the instigators of a pregame brawl between the Montreal Canadiens and the Philadelphia Flyers in the Montreal Forum prior to game six of the Wales Conference finals on May 14, 1987, an act which earned him a suspension for the remainder of that year's playoffs.

While with the Rangers, Hospodar's face was badly damaged by Clark Gillies of the New York Islanders in a 1981 fight at Madison Square Garden. In 450 NHL games, Hospodar scored 17 goals and had 51 assists, with four goals and one assist during 44 playoff games. He acquired 1314 penalty minutes during his regular season games, and 208 penalty minutes during his playoff games. Hospodar retired from hockey in 1988.

As a youth, Hospodar played in the 1972 Quebec International Pee-Wee Hockey Tournament with a minor ice hockey team from Toronto.

Hospodar received his nickname in junior hockey after a writer deemed the force of his checks to be commensurate with that of a "runaway boxcar". Although born in the United States, Hospodar learned the game in Canada; his father was a plant manager for the Campbell's Soup Company, overseeing plants in New Jersey, Ohio, and later Ontario. Hospodar's brother became a Byzantine Catholic priest.

Career statistics

References

External links
 

1959 births
Living people
American men's ice hockey defensemen
Buffalo Sabres players
Canadian ice hockey defencemen
Hartford Whalers players
Ice hockey players from Ohio
Ice hockey people from Ontario
Minnesota North Stars players
New Haven Nighthawks players
New York Rangers draft picks
New York Rangers players
Ottawa 67's players
People from Bowling Green, Ohio
Philadelphia Flyers players
Rochester Americans players
Sportspeople from Mississauga